Sana Ibrahim (born 15 January 2003 in Cairo) is an Egyptian professional squash player. As of February 2020, she was ranked number 84 in the world. She won her first professional title in the 2020 Egyptian Squash Tour.

References

2003 births
Living people
Egyptian female squash players
21st-century Egyptian women